Hadji Mustafa Pasha (Хаџи Мустафа-паша, ; 1733—27 December 1801) was an Ottoman commander and politician of Greek Muslim origin who lived in Sanjak of Smederevo (in modern-day Serbia). He fought in the Austro-Turkish War (1787–1791) and the Russo-Turkish War (1768–1774). In the period between 1793 and 1801 he was Vizier of the Sanjak of Smederevo (also known as Belgrade Pashaluk). On 15 December 1801 he was murdered by Kuchuk Alija, one of four rebel Janissary leaders (dahije) who took control over the sanjak.

Biography 
Born in 1733, of Greek Muslim origin, he was surnamed Şinikoğlu. As hajji, he carried out a pilgrimage to Mecca and Medina, and was also a member of the Bektashi Order. He was among the notable Ottomans who had fought during the Austro-Turkish War (1787–91) and the Russo-Turkish War (1768–74).

Mustafa Pasha was the main government architect (bina emin) in the Pashalik of Belgrade before he became Vizier of the Belgrade Pashaluk in July 1793. He closely collaborated with Peter Ichko and according to some sources both of them were members of one masonic lodge. As a friend of the Serb people, he was nicknamed the "Serbian mother".

In 1793 and 1796 Selim III proclaimed firmans in which gave more rights to Serbs. Among other things, taxes were to be collected by local Serbian rulers with the title of obor-knez (dukes); freedom of trade and religion were granted and ordinary Serbs began to live in peace.

Selim III also decreed that some unpopular Janissaries were to leave the Belgrade Pashaluk as he saw them as a threat to the central authority of Hadži Mustafa Pasha. Many of those Janissaries were employed by or found refuge with Osman Pazvantoğlu, a renegade opponent of Sultan Selim III in the Sanjak of Vidin. Fearing the dissolution of the Janissary command in Sanjak of Smederevo, Osman Pazvantoğlu launched a series of raids against Serbian brigands without the permission of Sultan Selim III causing much volatility and fear in the region.

Mustafa Pasha engaged mercenary forces in order to fight against forces of Osman Pazvantoğlu. To finance these forces Mustafa Pasha had to increase taxes. He accepted the proposal of local ober knezes to allow them to establish their own forces consisting of 16,000 Serbs led by Serb officers, commanded by Stanko Arambašić from Veliko Selo, to prevent the rebellion because of the increased taxes.

In the summer of 1797 the sultan appointed Mustafa Pasha on position of beglerbeg of Rumelia Eyalet and he left Serbia for Plovdiv to fight against the Vidin rebels of Pazvantoğlu. During the absence of Mustafa Pasha the forces of Pazvantoğlu together with Janissaries captured Požarevac and besieged Belgrade fortress. At the end of November 1797 ober knezes from Valjevo Aleksa Nenadović, Ilija Birčanin and Nikola Grbović brought their forces to Belgrade and forced besieging Janissary forces to retreat to Smederevo.

In January 1798 Mustafa Pasha ordered his forces together with Serb forces under command of Ilija Birčanin to attack Janissary forces in Smederevo. However, on January 30, 1799, the court of Sultan Selim III allowed the Janissaries to return, referring to them as local Muslims from the Sanjak of Smederevo. Initially the Janissaries accepted the authority of the Belgrade Pasha under Hadži Mustafa Pasha. Until a Janissary in Šabac, named Bego Novljanin, demanded from a Serb a surcharge and murdered the Serb when he refused to pay. Fearing the worst Hadži Mustafa Pasha, marched on Šabac with a force of 600 to ensure that the Janissary was brought to justice and order was restored. On the 27 of December three of the 200 of those guarding Hadži Mustafa Pasha's quarters entered his room and after a short exchange one of the three Kuchuk Alija shot Mustafa. The body of the Pasha was then displayed through the streets of Belgrade. Before his death Mustafa Pasha allegedly instructed his son, Dervish Bey, to unite his forces with Serb forces and capture Belgrade from dahias.

Citations

Sources
 

18th-century Ottoman military personnel
Pashas
Civil servants from the Ottoman Empire
People from the Ottoman Empire of Greek descent
Ottoman Serbia
1733 births
1801 deaths
Leaders ousted by a coup